"Funkentelechy" is a song by the funk band Parliament. It is the fourth track on the group's 1977 album Funkentelechy Vs. the Placebo Syndrome and was released as a two-part single in 1978. Part 1 peaked at number 27 on the U.S. R&B Singles chart. The song's title is a play on the philosophical concept of entelechy.

Trivia
 The phrase "Urge Overkill" from George Clinton's radio announcer-style patter on the song later became the name of an alternative rock band.
 One of Clinton's quips during the song, "Like a woodpecker with a headache," resembles the mood indication on a piano piece by the eccentric composer Erik Satie: "Like a nightingale with a toothache."
This song was sampled by Ice Cube for his song "Doing Dumb Shit" on his album Death Certificate.
 The repeated phrase "You deserve a break today - Have it your way" is a reference to McDonald's "You Deserve a Break Today" and Burger King's "Have it Your Way" ad campaigns of the time.
 The repeated references to "The Pleasure Principle" are a nod to Sigmund Freud's Pleasure Principle theory in psychology.

Charts

Weekly charts

References

Parliament (band) songs
1978 singles
Songs written by George Clinton (funk musician)
Casablanca Records singles
Songs written by Bootsy Collins
1977 songs